Gothenburg and Bohus County was a county of Sweden until 1 January 1998, when it was merged with Skaraborg County and Älvsborg County to form Västra Götaland County.

The county was named after the city of Gothenburg and the historical province of Bohuslän. Gothenburg was the seat of residence for the governor and represented the westernmost part of the province of Västergötland.

See also
 List of governors of Gothenburg and Bohus County
 List of governors of Älvsborg County
 List of governors of Skaraborg County
 List of governors of Västra Götaland County
 County Governors of Sweden

References

 
Former counties of Sweden
Västra Götaland County
History of Bohuslän
1680 establishments in Sweden
1997 disestablishments in Sweden